The 2018–19 Northern Colorado Bears women's basketball team represented the University of Northern Colorado during the 2018–19 NCAA Division I women's basketball season. The Bears were led by first year head coach Jenny Huth, played their home games at the Bank of Colorado Arena as members of the Big Sky Conference. They finished the season 21–11, 15–5 in Big Sky play to finish in a tie for second place. They advanced to the semifinals of the Big Sky women's tournament where they lost to Eastern Washington. They received an at-large bid to the WNIT where they lost to Wyoming in the first round.

Roster

Schedule and results

|-
!colspan=9 style=| Exhibition

|-
!colspan=9 style=| Non-conference regular season

|-
!colspan=9 style=| Big Sky regular season

|-
!colspan=9 style=| Big Sky Women's Tournament

|-
!colspan=9 style=| WNIT

Rankings
2018–19 NCAA Division I women's basketball rankings

See also
 2018–19 Northern Colorado Bears men's basketball team

References

Northern Colorado
Northern Colorado Bears women's basketball seasons
Northern Colorado Bears women's basketball
Northern Colorado Bears women's basketball
Northern Colorado